David Snow (born November 9, 1989) is an American football offensive lineman who is currently a free agent. He was originally signed by the Buffalo Bills as an undrafted free agent in 2012. He played college football at Texas. He is now a restaurant operator at a Chick-fil-A in Marshall, Texas.

Professional career

Buffalo Bills
Snow was signed by the Buffalo Bills on April 30, 2012. He was released by the Bills on October 15, 2012 and re-signed to the Bills' practice squad on October 16, 2012.
He was released by the Bills on August 30, 2013.

References

External links
Buffalo Bills bio
Texas Longhorns bio
Just Sports Stats

1989 births
Living people
People from Longview, Texas
Players of American football from Texas
American football centers
American football offensive guards
Texas Longhorns football players
Buffalo Bills players
Pittsburgh Steelers players